National Highway 503A, commonly called NH 503A is a national highway in  India. It is a branch of National Highway 3. NH-503A traverses the state of Punjab and Himachal Pradesh in India.

Route 
Punjab
Amritsar, Mehta, Ghuman, Sri Hargobindpur, Tanda, Hoshiarpur.
Himachal Pradesh
Una, Basoli, Barsar, Salooni, Bhota.

Junctions  
 
  Terminal near Amritsar.
  near Tanda.
  near Hoshiarpur. 
  near Una.
  Terminal near Bhota.

See also 
 List of National Highways in India
 List of National Highways in India by state

References

External links 
 NH 503A on OpenStreetMap

National highways in India
National Highways in Himachal Pradesh
National Highways in Punjab, India
Transport in Amritsar